Hexagon AB is a publicly listed global provider of information technology solutions that drive productivity and quality across geospatial and industrial landscapes and headquartered in Stockholm, Sweden.

Founded in 1975, Hexagon AB is a global multinational technology group for metrology and geoanalytics and the parent company of Leica Geosystems (Switzerland), among others. With over 19,200 employees, Hexagon AB generated annual sales of approximately €3.8 billion and annual profits of approximately €738 million in over 50 countries in 2018.

Divisions
Hexagon is organized in these divisions:
 Agriculture
 Autonomy & Positioning (A&P)
 Geosystems (GEO)
 Manufacturing Intelligence (MI)
 Mining (MIN)
 Asset Lifecycle Intelligence (ALI)
 Safety, Infrastructure & Geospatial (SIG)
 Xalt Solutions

Acquisitions

Acquisitions play a vital role in Hexagon's growth strategy. Since 2000, Hexagon has completed more than 170 acquisitions.

References

Technology companies of Sweden
Technology companies established in 1992
Software companies of Sweden
Software companies established in 1992
Companies based in Stockholm
Geographic data and information equipment companies
Swedish brands
Swedish companies established in 1992
Companies listed on Nasdaq Stockholm